GenX is a chemical process for producing Teflon and related chemicals, also used to refer to those chemicals.

GenX may also refer to:

 GenX, an open source capacity expansion energy system model
 General Electric GEnx, an aircraft engine 
 Tata GenX Nano, an Indian compact car

See also
 Gen X (disambiguation)